LGBT culture in Eugene, Oregon predates the Stonewall riots in New York in 1969, but that event coincided with organized efforts in Lane County, Oregon, to support and celebrate LGBT people. Even though Eugene has been rated on lists of cities friendly to LGBT populations, there are very few venues specifically for the LGBT community in the Eugene/Springfield metropolitan area.

LGBT pride festival 

Since 1993, committee volunteers have organized the Eugene/Springfield Pride Festival each year in August, rather than in June, "which is Pride Month, but you know that unique Eugene thing: We're different," according to the town's alternative newspaper. "Plus, we're too busy at the pride celebrations of the city to the north  in June. So: We're later, we're smaller, but we're still proud." The Eugene/Springfield  Pride Festival is supported by sponsorships and volunteer help.

History highlights 
 1969 - UO's Gay Peoples Alliance forms
 1974 - UO's Pride Week organized
 1975 - Lane County hotspots: Mother Kali's
 1978 - Ordinance banning discrimination against LGBT repealed in Eugene
 1983 - Lane County hotspots: Club Arena
 1992 - Springfield anti-gay Ballot Measure 20-08 passes 
 1994 - Statewide anti-gay Measure 9 fails 
 1993 - Eugene/Springfield Pride Festival location: Amazon Park, Eugene
 1994 - Citizens United Against Discrimination forms in Lane County,  
 1994 - Statewide Anti-gay Measure 13 fails 
 1994 through 2000 Eugene/Springfield Pride Festival location: Maurie Jacobs Park, Eugene
 2001 though 2013 - Eugene/Springfield Pride Festival location: Alton Baker Park, Eugene
 2010 - Gay in the Park location: Washington Jefferson Park, Eugene

Source: EugenePride.org

Recreation and social activities 
A dedicated LGBTQ space, "The Wayward Lamb" opened in August 2015. Calling itself "Eugene's Official Queer Pub", the venue also offered a private event space and "unique dedicated queer programming". Citing the expectation that it was "a de facto LGBTQ (lesbian, gay, bisexual, transgender, queer) community center as well as a bar", the owner closed the bar in February 2018. The space re-opened as Spectrum in the summer of 2018 as a re-branded queer bar under new management offering a quiet reading room and southern-inspired dining in addition to the usual drag shows, lip-synch battles, and debauchery.

A variety of other LGBTQ social, political, and support groups meet in Eugene:
 Eugene Interweave is a church-supported group "dedicated to the spiritual, political, and social well being of gay Unitarian Universalists, allies, friends, and community". The group sponsors a potluck and film on the second Friday each month.
 Imperial Sovereign Court of the Emerald Empire is a non-profit social and community service organization hosting performances and activities to raise funds for local community charities and services.
 The Broadway Revue Burlesque Show performs every Sunday evening at Luckeys Club Cigar Store, one of the oldest businesses in downtown Eugene.
 Rain BoWomen meet twice monthly for dinner at restaurants in the Eugene/Springfield area.
 Soromundi Lesbian Chorus of Eugene  ("sisters of the world") is a non-audition choir open to all women, celebrating themselves and community as "a visible expression of lesbian pride".
Additional local resources are listed by the University of Oregon on the UOUT site.

See also 
 Eugene Local Measure 51

References

Sources
 Eugene makes list of America's most gay friendly cities. KVAL News, Jan 11, 2012. Retrieved June 12, 2014.
 Eugene ranked seventh gayest city in America Daily Emerald, Jan 11, 2013. Retrieved June 12, 2014.
 Eugene-Springfield LGBT Pride Festival Eugene Weekly, Retrieved June 12, 2014. Aug 8, 2013.
 Gay Friendly? Eugene Weekly, Feb 14, 2013. Retrieved June 12, 2014.
 Gayest Cities in America, The Advocate, January 9, 2012. Retrieved June 15, 2014.
 It's time to celebrate The Gay!  Eugene Weekly: News, Aug 09, 2007. Retrieved June 12, 2014. 
 LGBT Travel Eugene, Cascades & Coast - Travel Lane County. Retrieved June 12, 2014.

External links
 Diversity Retrieved June 12, 2014.
 Eugene/Springfield Pride Festival Retrieved June 12, 2014.
 UOUT Where Community Connects Retrieved June 12, 2014.

Culture of Eugene, Oregon
LGBT culture in Oregon
LGBT culture in the United States by city